Men's Giant Slalom World Cup 1999/2000

Final point standings

In Men's Giant Slalom World Cup 1999/2000 all results count. Austrian athletes won eight races out of nine.

References
 fis-ski.com

World Cup
FIS Alpine Ski World Cup men's giant slalom discipline titles